Oliver Caruso  is a German weightlifter. He won the Bronze medal in the 91 kg  in the 1996 Summer Olympics in Atlanta.

References 

German male weightlifters
Olympic weightlifters of Germany
Weightlifters at the 1996 Summer Olympics
Weightlifters at the 1992 Summer Olympics
Olympic bronze medalists for Germany
Olympic medalists in weightlifting
1974 births
Living people
Medalists at the 1996 Summer Olympics
20th-century German people